Athanasios Toutoungi (born on 6 September 1899 in Alexandretta, now İskenderun, Turkey - died on 20 February 1981) was an archbishop of the Melkite Greek Catholic Archeparchy of Aleppo in Syria.

Life

Athanasios Toutoungi was on July 20, 1927 ordained to the priesthood. His appointment as successor of Basilio Khouri as Archbishop of Homs was on October 1, 1938, and Toutoungi was consecrated on 27 November 1938. In this office he was succeeded by Archbishop Jean Bassoul.

On December 5, 1961 Toutoungi became the successor of Isidore Fattal as Archbishop of Aleppo  and held that post until his retirement on March 6, 1968 at the same time he was appointed Titular Archbishop of Tarsus of Greek Melkites and was appointed to his death on February 20, 1981 Archbishop Emeritus of Aleppo, and was succeeded by Néophytos Edelby. Toutoungi took part in all four sessions of the Second Vatican Council (1962-1965). During his tenure, he consecrated Justin Abraham Najmy, BA Bishop of Newton (Massachusetts, USA) and was co-consecrator of the Melkite Archbishops Paul Achkar, Hilarion Capucci and Elias Nijmé.

References

External links
 http://www.catholic-hierarchy.org/bishop/btout.html
 https://web.archive.org/web/20150204072655/http://apostolische-nachfolge.de/titulare_t.htm

1899 births
1981 deaths
Syrian Melkite Greek Catholics
Melkite Greek Catholic bishops
Syrian archbishops
Eastern Catholic bishops in Syria